"Salam Farmandeh" (Hi Commander'), also known as 'Salam Ya Mahdi', is a Persian song produced by Iranian artist, "Abuzar Rouhi", about Imam Mahdi (a.s.) and is mainly performed in large groups by youngsters around the world.

The song, a relatively long choir in the pop genre, was released in March 2022 just before the New Persian Year (Farvardin 1401) on social media and later received attention in April and May 2022. The song apparently is targeted at and highlights the contribution of the new generation in supporting the Islamic Revolution and its ideology. organizations have been active in mobilizing school students to form choirs of the song in large groups, showcasing the largest one in Azadi Stadium.

Cast 

The singer who sang "Salam Farmandeh" is Abuzar Ruhi who performed it for Gilan IRIB TV, the music video of which debuted in March 2022. The music video was recorded in Jamkaran Mosque, produced by Mehrane BehNahad, and directed by Mahyar Talebi. The songwriter is Mahdi BaniHashemi

Mass performance at Azadi Stadium 

On May 26, 2022, there was a large gathering in Azadi Stadium and Sports Complex in Western Tehran and its surrounding areas where some tens of thousands attended together with their children to perform the song in a choir orchestrated by the professional artists live. State media reported the gathering to be 100,000 in size.

Chanting in other locations 
Globally, this song is known as 'Salam Ya Mahdi'. The song has been also chanted in countries other than Iran according to news outlets and published content on social media.

The song has been translated into many languages including French, Arabic, Urdu, Azerbaijani, Pashto, Kurdish, Malay, and Swahilli.

References 

Children's music
Propaganda in Iran